Gallacoccus is a genus of the scale insects commonly known as beesoniids. They typically cause galls on their plant hosts. Gallacoccus anthonyae is the type species. Female members of the genus Gallacoccus have only three instars, in contrast to the other beesoniid genera where the females have four.

Species
 Gallacoccus heckrothi Takagi, 2001
 Gallacoccus anthonyae Beardsley, 1971
 Gallacoccus secundus Beardsley, 1971
 Gallacoccus spinigalla Takagi, 2001

Notes

References
 
 

Sternorrhyncha genera
Beesoniidae